Harmon Hall (July 22, 1818 – June 30, 1891) was an American shoe manufacturer and politician who served in the Massachusetts General Court and on the Massachusetts Governor's Council.

Early life
Hall was born on July 22, 1818, in Portland, Maine. When he was five his family moved to East Saugus, Massachusetts. He was educated in the Saugus Public Schools as well as the Lynn and New Market academies. He married Lucinda Atherton of Goffstown, New Hampshire. They had two children, Harmon and Susie.

Politics
Hall held numerous offices in Saugus, including town clerk, selectman, and town moderator. In 1861 he represented the 24th Essex District in the Massachusetts House of Representatives. That same year, Governor John Albion Andrew appointed Hall to the position of state prison inspector. In 1868 he was made a trustee of the State Reform School for Boys by Governor Alexander Bullock. He was reappointed by Governor William Claflin and served as chairman of the board for three years. In 1872 he resumed his former position as state prison inspector. In 1875 he was appointed to the Lancaster Industrial School for Girls board of trustees by Governor William Gaston. In 1876, Hall represented the First Essex district in the Massachusetts Senate. The following year he was elected to the Massachusetts Governor's Council. In 1880 and 1881 he again served in the state senate.

Business career
Hall manufactured shoes and boots from 1850 to 1874. He was associated with George Raddin from 1850 to 1852 and John W. Newhall from 1852 and 1855 before going into business solo. He was also a founder and longtime president of the Saugus Mutual Fire Insurance Company. He was successful in business and owned an estate on Chestnut Street in East Saugus. Hall died on June 30, 1891.

References

1818 births
1891 deaths
Republican Party Massachusetts state senators
Members of the Massachusetts Governor's Council
Republican Party members of the Massachusetts House of Representatives
People from Saugus, Massachusetts
Shoemakers
Politicians from Portland, Maine